The Wedding Palace or Palace of Rituals is a building in Tbilisi designed by architects Victor Djorbenadze and Vazha Orbeladze. It was built in 1984 as a wedding venue.

History 
The building, drawing on influences as diverse as 1920s expressionism and medieval Georgian church architecture, met with mixed critical reviews.

Visiting celebrities were often invited to the Wedding Palace - Margaret Thatcher was treated to a Georgian dance performance during her 1987 visit, and Deep Purple frontman Ian Gillan renewed his vows with wife Bron while touring in 1990.

In 2002 it was purchased by the oligarch Badri Patarkatsishvili for use as his personal residence. In 2013, the Wedding Palace was leased to a private events company and currently hosts weddings, fundraisers, and corporate functions.

References

Buildings and structures in Tbilisi
Palaces in Georgia (country)
Buildings and structures completed in 1984
1984 establishments in Georgia (country)
Buildings and structures built in the Soviet Union
Modernist architecture